Dodds is an unincorporated community in New Madrid County, in the U.S. state of Missouri.

The community is on Missouri Route D between Catron and Lilbourn. New Madrid lies 7.5 miles to the east. The St. Louis Southwestern Railway passes just north of the community.

History
Variant names were Dodds Spur", "Sky" and "Warrington". The community has the name of E. M. Dodd, a railroad official. The local post office was called "Spurdod". The Spurdod post office opened and closed in 1918.

References

Unincorporated communities in New Madrid County, Missouri
Unincorporated communities in Missouri